Blue Stars or Bluestars may refer to:

Music 
 Blue Stars Drum and Bugle Corps, from La Crosse, Wisconsin
 The Bluestars, a 1960s band from Auckland, New Zealand
 Bluestars (album), the first album by Pretty Ricky
 The Blue Stars, a vocal ensemble led by Blossom Dearie

Sports 
 Blue Stars (basketball club), based in Diemen, North Holland, the Netherlands
 Blue Stars (Lebanon), a team in the Lebanese Basketball League
 Bluestars (GAA), invitational Gaelic football and hurling teams
 FC Blue Stars Zürich a Zürich based Football Club

Other uses 
 Chamaescilla corymbosa, a plant also known as Blue Stars

See also
 Blue star (disambiguation)